Korea Broadcasting Art School   is an educational institution in Seoul, South Korea with the credit bank system of the National Institute for Lifelong Education.

The school is located in 197 Sinchon-ro, Seodaemun-gu, Seoul (67-11 Daehyeon-dong) with its own campus and buildings from Hall 1 to Hall 7.

Departments 
Korea Broadcasting Art School offers a total of 39 academic  programs, organized into 6 departments.

Video production department

Entertainment department

Practical music department

Sound production department

Visual design department

Beauty design department

Facility 
Video production lab
KBAS Creative Studio
Voice Actor Lab
Practical Music Lab
Practical Dance Lab
Beauty Design Lab
Model Lab
Sound Lab
Art Hall
Main building

Notable alumni

Voice actor major
Jung Hyewon: Class of '01, CJ E&M
Kim Dodam: Class of '06, KBS 
Kim Min-ah: Class of '06, KBS 
Park Chu-kwang: Class of 2008, KBS 
Jung Yu-jung: Class of 2010, CJ E&M
Kim Daol: Class of 2010, CJ E&M
Kim Hyunwook: Class of 2011, Daewon Broadcasting Co.ltd
Jang Jimin: Class of 2012, KBS 
Oh Gabin: Class of 2013, Daekyo Broadcasting Co.ltd 
Park Jun-won: Class of 2013, Daewon Broadcasting Co.ltd
Lim Chaebin: Class of 2014, Daewon Broadcasting Co.ltd
Kim Yoongi: Class of 2016, CJ E&M
Kim Chae-rim: Class of 2018, CJ E&M

References

Schools in Seoul
Educational institutions established in 1992
1992 establishments in South Korea